

Belgium
 Congo Free State 
 Théophile Wahis, Governor-General of the Congo Free State (1892–1908)
 Émile Wangermée, acting Governor-General of the Congo Free State (1896–1900)

France
 French Somaliland – Léonce Lagarde, Governor of French Somaliland (1888–1899)
 Guinea –
 Paul Jean François Cousturier, Lieutenant-Governor of Guinea (1895–1896)
 Noël-Eugène Ballay, Lieutenant-Governor of Guinea (1896–1898)

Japan
 Taiwan
Kabayama Sukenori, Governor-General of Taiwan (21 May 1895 – June 1896)
Katsura Tarō, Governor-General of Taiwan (2 June 1896 – October 1896)
Nogi Maresuke, Governor-General of Taiwan (14 October 1896 – January 1898)

Portugal
 Angola –
 Álvaro Ferreira, Governor-General of Angola (1893–1896)
 Gilherme Auguste de Brito Capelo, Governor-General of Angola (1896–1897)

United Kingdom
 Malta Colony – Arthur Fremantle, Governor of Malta (1893–1899)
 Colony of Natal – Sir Walter Hely-Hutchinson (1893–1901)
 New South Wales – Viscount Hampden, Governor of New South Wales (1895–1899)
 North-Eastern Rhodesia – Patrick William Forbes, Administrator of North-Eastern Rhodesia (1895–1897)
 Queensland – Charles Cochrane-Baillie, Governor of Queensland (1896 - 31 December 1900 then State Governor on Australia's Federation to 1901)
 Royal Niger Company – Sir George Taubman Goldie, Governor of the Royal Niger Company (1895–1900)
 Tasmania – Jenico Preston, Lord Gormanston, Governor of Tasmania (1893–1900)
 South Australia – Sir Thomas Buxton, Governor of South Australia (1895–1899)
 Victoria – Thomas, Earl Brassey, Governor of Victoria (1895–1900)
 Western Australia – Lieutenant-Colonel Gerard Smith, Governor of Western Australia (1895–1900)

Colonial governors
Colonial governors
1896